Gary Wales (born 4 January 1979) is a Scottish former professional footballer.

Career
Wales, a striker, started his career at Hamilton. In 35 games he scored 11 goals before moving to Hearts for £50,000. In five years at Tynecastle, Wales scored 17 goals in 92 appearances. He was then sent out on loan to Walsall, scoring once against Nottingham Forest, before subsequently signing for Gillingham (scoring once against Coventry City) and then Kilmarnock, where he was re-united with former Hearts manager Jim Jefferies.

After leaving Kilmarnock in the summer of 2008, Wales signed a short-term deal with Raith Rovers. Wales settled to become a regular goalscorer. In April 2009, with Raith he won the Scottish Second Division championship, Wales left the club to pursue an opportunity in Australia. Towards the end of May 2009, Wales joined North Queensland Fury on their pre-season tour of Singapore.

References

External links

Scotland U21 stats at Fitbastats

1979 births
Living people
Footballers from West Lothian
People from East Calder
Scottish footballers
Scottish Premier League players
Hamilton Academical F.C. players
Heart of Midlothian F.C. players
Walsall F.C. players
Gillingham F.C. players
Kilmarnock F.C. players
Raith Rovers F.C. players
Scotland under-21 international footballers
Association football forwards